Chionodes xylobathra is a moth in the family Gelechiidae. It is found in Venezuela.

References

Chionodes
Moths described in 1936
Moths of South America